Lole may refer to:

Carlos Reutemann (1942–2021), Argentine retired racing driver and politician nicknamed "Lole"
Simon Lole (born 1957), choral director, organist, composer, arranger and broadcaster
Lole language, spoken on Roti Island, Indonesia
Lolë, an athletic apparel design and retail company based in Canada

See also
 Lole y Manuel, a Spanish Romani musical duo
 Loles León (born 1950), Spanish actress
 LOLE, loss of load expectation in an electrical system